Eazel was an American software company operating from 1999 to 2001 in Palo Alto and then Mountain View, California. The company's flagship product is the Nautilus file manager for the GNOME desktop environment on Linux, which was immediately adopted and maintained by the free software movement. As the core of Eazel's business model, it is an early example of cloud storage services in the form of personal file storage, transparently and portably stored on the Internet. Renamed to Files, this application continues to be a centerpiece of the free Linux-based desktop environment.

History
Eazel was founded by Andy Hertzfeld in August 1999 in Mountain View, California. It had 22 initial employees and raised  from several venture capital investment companies. Initially, all the programmers worked on every aspect of the product and eventually specialized on its components.

The company grew from 22 employees in 1999 to 75 employees in 2001 and was named one of the top 10 companies to watch among "earsplitting buzz surrounding Linux", by Red Herring magazine.

Staff consisted of former employees of many luminary technology companies such as Apple, Netscape, Be Inc., Linuxcare, Microsoft, Red Hat, and Sun Microsystems. Mike Boich was CEO, having been a major figure at Apple and co-founder of Radius; Bud Tribble was VP of Engineering, having been software manager and a designer of the original Macintosh project; Andy Hertzfeld was a principal designer, having been a lead software engineer and a designer of the original Macintosh project; Darin Adler led development, having been the technical lead for System 7 for the Macintosh; and Susan Kare designed new vector graphics-based iconography, having designed the original Macintosh icons. Other staff included programmer Maciej Stachowiak, who was a programmer and board member for GNOME; and board member Michael Homer, formerly of Apple, AOL, and Netscape.

Eazel's flagship product is the Nautilus file manager for the GNOME desktop environment. In this, the company faced several simultaneous challenges: creating a lot of intricate user-facing software from scratch or from existing code which must target all the disparate Linux environment versions; integrating a corporate personality into the existing and outspoken volunteer community of the GNOME desktop environment; building upon a very small nascent market of Linux desktop users among an already widely served and monopolized desktop computing market; and monetizing free software for individual consumers by creating essential business services. In other words, Eazel sought to switch a groundswell of users from Macintosh and Windows to a new and immature system that free software users would want to pay for. Of the two predominant free desktop environments for Linux, the choice to target GNOME instead of KDE was made largely because of the questionable legality of the Qt license upon which KDE was based.

In December 2000, Dell invested a "substantial stake" in Eazel and committed to preloading Nautilus on its Linux-based desktop and laptop systems, while Eazel preannounced its core business services which were woven directly into the free Nautilus application. Described as the "network user experience", those services are the Software Catalog to aid users in locating and installing applications, and Eazel Online Storage for easily storing and browsing files via their desktop or web browser.

The company failed to successfully monetize, or to secure more funding before venture capital ran out, and the technology market changed drastically in the two years of the company's lifespan. On March 13, 2001, Eazel simultaneously launched the first release of Nautilus (version 1.0), and laid off most of its 75 employees in an attempt to secure funding in its final few months. The company attempted to sell its core development group but ceased operations on May 15, 2001.

Hertzfeld arranged a meeting with Steve Jobs and most of Apple's high level management. In June 2001, most of Eazel's final roster of senior engineers joined Apple's Safari team, including Bud Tribble, Don Melton, Darin Adler, John Sullivan, Ken Kocienda, and Maciej Stachowiak.

Legacy
Received positively, the Nautilus file manager was incorporated into GNOME since GNOME version 1.4. GNOME has renamed Nautilus to Files and now refers to some of Eazel's early concept of "network user experience" as "cloud storage", which is provisioned by a variety of sources including the complimentary Google Drive. Files is continuously maintained by the free software movement as a centerpiece of the free Linux-based desktop environment.

See also

 History of free and open-source software#Desktop (1984–)
 Chandler, a defunct free software PIM app
 Taligent and Kaleida Labs, previous software spinoffs by Apple veterans, via the AIM alliance

References

External links
 GNOME Files

Linux companies
GNOME companies
Free software companies
Defunct software companies of the United States
Companies based in Mountain View, California